was an admiral in the Imperial Japanese Navy during World War II.

Biography
A native of Miyazaki prefecture, Shima was a graduate of the 39th class of the Imperial Japanese Naval Academy in 1911, ranking 69th out of 148 cadets. As an ensign, he was assigned to the battleship , and as a sub-lieutenant, he served on the battlecruiser , and cruiser .

Shima was promoted to lieutenant in 1918, and after taking courses in torpedo warfare and navigation, was assigned as Chief Communications Officer on the battlecruiser . In 1921, he graduated from the Naval War College and was promoted to lieutenant commander.

In 1928–1929, he was sent to the United States and Europe. On his return, he served in a number of staff positions, primarily as an instructor at various naval ordnance schools.

In 1933, he was promoted to captain, and in 1936, he received his first command, the cruiser . Shima became a rear admiral on 15 November 1939 and was Chief of Staff of the Maizuru Naval District.

Pacific War
With the start of the Pacific War, Shima was given a combat command, and led the Tulagi invasion force that occupied Tulagi in the Solomon Islands on 3 May 1942 as part of Operation Mo.

Shima was promoted to vice admiral on 1 May 1943, and on 15 February 1944 became Commander in Chief of the IJN 5th Fleet.

During the Battle of Leyte Gulf, 23–26 October 1944, Shima led the "Second Striking Force" of three cruisers and seven destroyers in the Battle of Surigao Strait. Vice-Admiral Shōji Nishimura′s and Vice-Admiral Shima's fleets were collectively called the "Southern Force". Because of the strict radio silence imposed on the forces, Shima was unable to synchronize his movements with those of Nishimura's. Shima's force—two heavy cruisers, a light cruiser and four destroyers—reached the battle after Nishimura's forces had run into a deadly trap and suffered losses. During the nighttime battle, Shima fired 16 torpedoes at two islands he mistook for American ships. Then, seeing what he thought were the wrecks of both of Nishimura's battleships, he ordered a retreat, "At that time, things flashed in my head were thus: ... If we continued dashing further north, it was quite clear that we should only fall into a ready trap." Retreating, his flagship, the heavy cruiser , collided with Nishimura's  heavy cruiser , flooding the latter's steering-room. Mogami fell behind in the retreat and was sunk by aircraft the next morning.

After this disaster, Shima was reassigned to command the Takao Guard District from 10 May 1945 to 30 November 1945. From 10 May to 15 June 1945, he was also final commander of the First Air Fleet.

Postwar
In 1959, in response to a letter from 16-year-old Bill Frazer of San Fernando, California, Shima defended his actions and performance in the Battle of Surigao Strait. In particular, Shima found fault with historian James A. Field Jr who, in reference to the utter defeat of Japanese forces in the battle, referred to Shima as "the buffoon of the tragedy."

References

Books

External links

1890 births
1973 deaths
People from Miyazaki Prefecture
Japanese admirals of World War II
Imperial Japanese Navy admirals